The MIM-72A/M48 Chaparral is an American-made self-propelled surface-to-air missile system based on the AIM-9 Sidewinder air-to-air missile system. The launcher is based on the M113 family of vehicles. It entered service with the United States Army in 1969 and was phased out between 1990 and 1998. It was intended to be used along with the M163 VADS, the Vulcan ADS covering short-range short-time engagements, and the Chaparral for longer range use.

Development

Mauler
Starting in 1959 the U.S. Army MICOM (Missile Command) began development of an ambitious anti-aircraft missile system under their "Forward Area Air Defense" (FAAD) program. Known as the MIM-46 Mauler, it was based on a modified M113 chassis carrying a large rotating A-frame rack on top with nine missiles and both long-range search and shorter-range tracking radars. Operation was to be almost entirely automatic, with the operators simply selecting targets from the search radar's display and then pressing "fire". The entire engagement would be handled by the fire control computer.

In testing, Mauler proved to have numerous problems. Many of these were relatively minor, including problems with the rocket motors or fins on the airframe. Others, like problems with the fire control and guidance systems, appeared to be more difficult to solve. Army strategy from the mid-1950s PENTANA study was based on having embedded mobile anti-aircraft capability, and Mauler's delays put this entire program in question. More worrying, a new generation of Soviet attack aircraft was coming into service. For both of these reasons the Mauler program was scaled back in 1963 and alternatives were studied.

IFAAD
MICOM was directed to study whether or not the Navy's AIM-9D Sidewinder missile could be adapted for the ground-to-air role. Since the Sidewinder was guided by an infrared seeker, it would not be confused by ground clutter like the  radar-guided Mauler. On the downside, the missile required some time to "lock on", and the current generation seekers were only able to lock onto the tail of an aircraft. MICOM's report was cautiously optimistic, concluding that the Sidewinder could be adapted very quickly, although it would have limited capability.

A new concept, the "Interim Forward Area Air Defense" (IFAAD) evolved around the Sidewinder. The main concern was that at shorter distances the missile would not have time to lock onto the target before it flew out of range, so to serve this need a second vehicle based around the M61 Vulcan cannon was specified. Both would be aimed manually, eliminating the delay needed for a fire control system to develop a "solution". Neither vehicle concept had room for a search radar, so a separate radar system using datalink was developed for this role.

The studies were completed in 1965 and the Chaparral program was begun. The first XMIM-72A missiles were delivered to the US Army in 1967. Ford developed the M730 vehicle, adapted from the M548, itself one of the many versions of the widely used M113. The first Chaparral battalion was deployed in May 1969.

A small target-acquisition area radar, the AN/MPQ-49 Forward Area Alerting Radar (FAAR), was developed in 1966 to support the Chaparral/Vulcan system, although the FAAR is transported by the Gama Goat and thus not suitable for use in the front line.

Description
The complete system was known as the M48 Chaparral Intercept-Aerial Guided Missile System, composed of the M54 Launching Station atop the M730 carrier, a M113 variant. M730A1 had M113A2 improvements, while M730A2 was upgraded to M113A3 standard complete with diesel engine

The launcher was capable of a full 360 degrees traverse and +90/-9 degrees of elevation. Four missiles were carried on the launch rails, with eight extras stored below the launcher with their fins and wings removed. The gunner sat between the missile pairs on the mount, aiming using a simple reflex sight. An auxiliary power unit provides the necessary power to run the mount, and a cryonic air cooler provides the missile seekers with the necessary cooling. On early models the power unit was a two-cylinder 10 horsepower gasoline engine, though it was replaced with a more powerful 30 hp diesel engine in the early 1980s, greatly improving available power while simultaneously allowing fuel compatibility with the main engine.

In 1984, a FLIR unit was installed to give the system an all-weather/night capability.

The MIM-72A missile was based on the AIM-9D Sidewinder. The main difference is that to reduce drag only two of the fins on the MIM-72A have rollerons, the other two having been replaced by fixed thin fins. The MIM-72's MK 50 solid-fuel rocket motor was essentially identical to the MK 36 MOD 5 used in the AIM-9D Sidewinder.

MIM-72B was a training missile with the radar fuze replaced with an IR model for use against target drones.

1974 saw the introduction of the MIM-72C, used the advanced AN/DAW-1B seeker with all-aspect capability, as well as a new doppler radar fuze and M250 blast-frag warhead. The fuze and warhead were adapted from the earlier Mauler program. C models were deployed between 1976 and 1981, reaching operational status in 1978. 

A naval version of the missile was also developed, based on the C version of the missile – the RIM-72C Sea Chaparral. This was not adopted by the U.S. Navy, however it was exported to Taiwan.

MIM-72D was built for export, combining the seeker of the "A" with the improved M250 warhead.

MIM-72E of the late 1970s used the M121 smokeless motor, which greatly reduced the smoke generated on firing, thus allowing easier follow-up shots and making it harder for enemy aircraft to find the launch site.

MIM-72F was an export model with the old Mk 50 motor and AN/DAW-1 seeker.

MIM-72G was the final upgrade to the system. The rosette scan seeker of the Stinger POST was adapted to the Chaparral by Ford in a program beginning in 1980. The improved AN/DAW-2 seeker offered a large field of view, as well as the ability to reject most flares and countermeasures. All existing missiles had been updated by the late 1980s and new-build G models followed between 1990 and 1991. By this point in time the system was already being removed from regular Army service, and being handed over to the National Guard.

Two training missiles, the Trainer M30 and Trainer M33, were also built. Used for loading practice, these trainers used inert dummy components and could not be launched. For tracking practice, the Trainers could be fitted with tactical seekers. The M30 replicated the live "A" using the original Mk28 seeker head, while the M33 replicated "C" and later and was fitted with the AN/DAW series of seekers

Variants 

 MIM-72A Chaparral Original production missile.
 MIM-72B Training missile.
 MIM-72C Improved Chaparral. Featuring an improved AN/DAW-1 guidance section, M817 directional doppler fuze and a M250 blast-fragmentation warhead.
  RIM-72C Sea Chaparral. Naval version - Evaluated but not deployed by the US Navy. Adopted by Taiwan.
 MIM-72D Export version not used by the United States
 MIM-72E MIM-72C missiles retrofitted with a new M121 smokeless motor.
 MIM-72F Export version of the MIM-72C
 MIM-72G Fitted with a new AN/DAW-2 based on the seeker in the FIM-92 Stinger POST giving improved resistance to countermeasures. This was retrofitted to all Chaparral missiles during the late 1980s. New missiles were produced between 1990 and 1991.
 M30 Inert training missile based on MIM-72A
 M33 Inert training version of MIM-72C

Operators

 - 28 units purchased in the 1980s. Being phased out.

 - 34 systems received (23 in the A3 version and 11 in the A2 version) with 224 missiles. New VSHORAD systems will be received until 2024.

 Republic of China Marine Corps – built on M113 Chassis
 Republic of China Navy – installed on Kang Ding class frigate, Newport-class tank landing ship, Wu Yi-class fleet oiler, and Pan Shi-class fast combat support ship

Former

 - United States Army – All units removed from service by 1997.
 - Performed the one single shootdown by the system worldwide, a single Syrian MiG-17 that was part of an attack sortie on Israeli ground forces at Golan heights in May 1974. Removed from service by 2003.

General characteristics
 Length: 
 Wingspan: 
 Diameter: 
 Launch weight: 	
 Speed: Mach 1.5
 Range:  (Minimum arming distance) to 
 Altitude: 
 Guidance:
 MIM-72A: Mk 28 seeker, Passive infra-red tail chase only.
 MIM-72C/E: AN/DAW-1B all-aspect 
 MIM-72G: AN/DAW-2 rosetee scan
 Motor : 
 MIM-72A/B/C/D/F: MK 50 solid-fuel rocket motor for 4.7 s
  MIM-72E/G: M121 solid-fuel motor 
 Warhead: 
 MIM-72A:  MK 48 Continuous-rod warhead with  PBXN-1 explosive
 MIM-72C and later:  M250 blast-frag warhead with   Octol explosive

See also
 AIM-9 Sidewinder
 FIM-92 Stinger
 FIM-43 Redeye
 AN/TWQ-1 Avenger
Rapier (missile)

References

External links

 http://history.redstone.army.mil/miss-chaparral.html

Self-propelled anti-aircraft weapons of the United States
MIM072
Military vehicles introduced in the 1960s